Bernard Gordon may refer to:

Bernard Gordon (soldier) (1891–1963), Australian recipient of the Victoria Cross
Bernard Gordon (writer) (1918–2007), American screenwriter
Bernard G. Gordon (1916–1978), New York politician
Bernard Marshall Gordon (born 1927), American inventor and philanthropist

See also
Bernard de Gordon (died 1330), French doctor and professor of medicine
Bernard Gordon Lennox (1932–2017), British Army officer
Lord Bernard Gordon-Lennox (1878–1914), British Army officer